Chinorotwittayalai School (also known as Wat Chinorot School) is a co-education school for grades 7 through 12 in Wat Chinorasaram Woravihara, Thailand.

The school was founded by Somdej Phra Maha Somanachao Krom Phra Poramanuchit Chinoros in 1895.

History 
The princely monk, Somdej Phra Maha Somanachao Krom Phra Poramanuchit Chinoros ordered the construction of the temple in approximately 1836 (at that time Somdej Phra Maha Somanachao Krom Phra Poramanuchit Chinoros already died. He was born on December 11, 2333, died 2396).

Facts 
School Area : 4.6 acres (1.9 ha)

School Abbreviation : CNR

School Motto : son of chinorot will be a nice person

School Colors 
Blue is the color used in monasteries of Somdej Phra Maha Somanachao Krom Phra Poramanuchit Chinoros

White is a pure heart's Chinorotwitthayalai school students.

Buildings

Courses 
Science-Math
Math-English
English - French
English - Chinese
English - Japanese
Computer Arts

Student activities 
Sport day
The Teachers' Day Observation
Library Event
Post training

References 

Schools in Thailand